Soko may refer to:

Places
 Soko (Gračanica), a village in Bosnia and Herzegovina
 Soko Islands, a group of islands in Hong Kong
 Soko Airport, an airport serving Bondoukou in Côte d'Ivoire
 South Korea, a Sovereign state in East Asia

People
 Soko (singer) (born 1985), French singer
 Soko Richardson (1939–2004), American rhythm and blues drummer
 Soko Yamaoka, Japanese snowboarder
 John Soko (1968–1993), Zambian footballer

Organisations
 Sokol, a sports movement known just as "Soko" in Serbo-Croatian and some other languages.

Other uses
 SOKO, a Yugoslavian aircraft manufacturer
 SOKO (TV series)
 SOKO 5113, a German police procedural television programme
 SOKO Leipzig, a spin-off series
 Soko (band) or Sokoband, an American jazz fusion band
 Sökö, a variant of the five-card stud poker card game

See also
 Soko Grad (disambiguation)